This is a list of awards and nominations received by British-Irish director and screenwriter Martin McDonagh.

For his work in film he has received four Academy Award nominations. His first win was for Best Live Action Short Film for his short Six Shooter (2004).  McDonagh has been nominated for three other Academy Awards. He directed the dark comedy films In Bruges (2008), Seven Psychopaths (2012) and Three Billboards Outside Ebbing, Missouri (2017), the latter of which won three British Academy Film Awards from four nominations and two Golden Globe Awards from three nominations. He has also received a DGA Award nomination, and two Independent Spirit Award nominations.

Also known for his theatre work as a playwright with productions on both Broadway and the West End. In 1999 he was one of the recipients of the Europe Prize Theatrical Realities awarded to the Royal Court Theatre (with Sarah Kane, Mark Ravenhill, Jez Butterworth, Conor McPherson). He has been nominated for four Tony Awards for Best Play for The Beauty Queen of Leenane in 1998, The Lonesome West in 1999, The Pillowman in 2005, and The Lieutenant of Inishmore in 2006. He has also received five Laurence Olivier Award nominations winning three times for The Lieutenant of Inishmore, The Pillowman and Hangmen. He has also received a Drama Desk Award win out of three nominations.

Major associations

Film

Academy Awards

British Academy Film Awards

Golden Globe Awards

Theatre

Laurence Olivier Award

Tony Award

Industry awards

British Independent Film Awards

Directors Guild of America Awards

Evening Standard British Film Awards

Independent Spirit Awards

Critics awards

Boston Society of Film Critics

Chicago Film Critics Association

Film Critics Circle of Australia

Florida Film Critics Circle

Irish Film & Television Awards

London Film Critics' Circle

Online Film Critics Society

Phoenix Film Critics Society Awards

Festival awards

BFI London Film Festival

Cork Film Festival Awards

Flanders Film Festival

Filmfest Hamburg

Foyle Film Festival

Leuven Short Film Festival

San Sebastián Film Festival

Stockholm International Film Festival

Toronto International Film Festival

Venice Film Festival

Zurich Film Festival

Theatre Awards

Critics' Circle Theatre Award

Drama Desk Award

Europe Theatre Prize

Miscellaneous awards

Edgar Award

Saturn Award

References

External links
 

McDonagh, Martin